Some Good in All or A Thief in the Night is a 1911 American drama silent black and white short film directed by Maurice Costello and Robert Gaillard and starring Dolores Costello.

Cast
 Maurice Costello as Bill - a Providential Thief
 Van Dyke Brooke as Ben Hartley - a Blackmailer
 Robert Gaillard as John Lane
 Dolores Costello as Betty Lane - John's Daughter

References

External links
 

1911 drama films
1911 films
Silent American drama films
American silent short films
American black-and-white films
Films directed by Maurice Costello
Films directed by Robert Gaillard
Films about businesspeople
Vitagraph Studios short films
General Film Company
1910s American films